Yardbirds '68 is a double CD and LP record album by English rock group the Yardbirds.  Recorded in 1968 in New York City when the group was a quartet with guitarist Jimmy Page, it includes live performances and demos.  Page produced the album, which was released in November 2017 on his own record label.

Recording and release
The tracks were recorded during the Yardbirds' last American tour in 1968; the live recordings are from their performance at the Anderson Theater on 30 March and studio recordings are demos from sessions at Columbia Recording Studio in April.  Previously, the ten live tracks appeared on Live Yardbirds: Featuring Jimmy Page.  The album was issued by Epic Records in 1971, but was quickly withdrawn.  Most of the eight demos were included on the limited release Cumular Limit in 2000.

The live performance follows a typical Yardbirds' set list for the period and includes several of their best-known songs, including "The Train Kept A-Rollin'", "I'm a Man", "Shapes of Things", and "Over Under Sideways Down".  Ryan Reed of Rolling Stone noted that among the songs are three which carried over to Led Zeppelin: "Dazed and Confused", "White Summer", and "Knowing That I'm Losing You", which was later reworked as "Tangerine".

All three surviving members of the 1968 lineup (Jim McCarty, Chris Dreja and Jimmy Page) participated in preparing the album and issued a joint statement:

Critical reception
In a review for Classic Rock magazine, Ian Fortnam gave the album four out of five stars.  While he has favourable comments on some of the demos, he notes "the main attraction here is the live set" that includes Yardbirds' standards and "Dazed and Confused".  He adds that the audio has a brighter, cleaner sound than the 1971 Epic album; however, the song introductions and banter (provided by singer Keith Relf) have been unfortunately removed.

For the ten year anniversary edition of the Led Zeppelin biography, When Giants Walked the Earth, author Mick Wall commented on Yardbirds '68: "It's not overstating the case to describe this [album] as proto-Led Zeppelin... it's all right there in New York in March 1968 [with] the sonic templates of 'Train Kept A-Rollin', 'Dazed and Confused' and 'White Summer'".

Track listing
Writer credits are from the album liner notes.  Running times (not included in the notes) are taken from the AllMusic album overview.

Personnel
Keith Relf – vocals, harmonica, percussion
Jimmy Page – guitars
Chris Dreja – bass guitar, backing vocals
Jim McCarty – drums, percussion, vocals

References

The Yardbirds compilation albums
2017 compilation albums
Albums produced by Jimmy Page